Astaldi S.p.A. is an Italian multinational major construction company based in Rome. The group is active in the fields of civil engineering, hydraulic engineering, Electromechanical Engineering and transportation.

Significant subsidiaries include: Astaldi Concessioni, NBI, Astaldi Construction Corp, NBI, TEQ Construction Enterprise.

History
The company was founded in 1929 by Sante Astaldi, and a member of the Astaldi family remains on the company's board. Astaldi was involved in many major European civil works projects pre-World War II, including the Rome–Naples railway. After the war, the company extended its activities to Africa, where it focused on road construction. Between the 1950s and the 1970s, Astaldi's presence was introduced to the Middle East, Central and South America, and the Far East. The company split into Impresa Astaldi Estero S.p.A. (for foreign markets) and Impresa Astaldi Estero S.p.A. (for Italian projects) in 1950, but merged to form the present-day Astaldi S.p.A. in the 1980s. Astaldi continued to diversify its projects, entering new markets in the United States, Turkey and Indonesia throughout the 1980s and 1990s.

The Canadian portion of the company attempted to build a power station at Muskrat Falls in Labrador, Canada in 2016 without having a structural engineering permit to work on such a project. The company was deemed "professionally incompetent". In November 2020, Webuild acquired a 65% shareholding in Astaldi.

Major projects
Significant projects include:

Italy
Rome Metro completed in 1955
Genoa Metro completed in 1990
The Lampeggiano Dam in Italy completed in 1992
Milan Metro completed in 1999
The Rosamarina Dam in Sicily completed in 1999
The Rome-Naples High Speed Line completed in 2005

Romania
Arena Națională completed in 2011
Basarab Overpass completed in 2011

Turkey
 İzmit Bay Bridge, road bridge under construction with  longest span, due to be completed in 2017

Abroad
Caracas Metro in Venezuela completed in 1983
Large Electron–Positron Collider for CERN, Switzerland completed in 1989
Copenhagen Metro completed in 2002
 Upgrade for a key stretch of Bulgarian railway infrastructure completed in 2010
 Second line of Warsaw Metro completed in 2013
 Construction of the new International Terminal of Santiago International Airport, Santiago, Chile, completed in 2021.
 Expressway S2 in Warsaw, Poland completed in 2021.
 Construction on the Versova–Bandra Sea Link in Mumbai, India due to be completed in 2023.
 Construction of the dome structure of the European Extremely Large Telescope on Cerro Armazones for the European Southern Observatory in Chile due to be completed in 2024.

References

Companies based in Rome
Construction and civil engineering companies established in 1929
Companies listed on the Borsa Italiana
Construction and civil engineering companies of Italy
Italian companies established in 1929
Multinational companies headquartered in Italy
Italian brands